The 2020–21 season was the 101st season of Sporting Club East Bengal (EB or SCEB). Established in 1920, the club celebrated its centennial on 1 August 2020. Due to the COVID-19 pandemic, the Indian football season started on 1 August 2020 and is scheduled to end on 31 May 2021, with competitive matches occurring between November and March. The club competed in the Indian Super League (ISL) for the first time and finished their first ISL season in ninth place with 17 points.

Before the start of the season, East Bengal was very active in the transfer market. The club precontracted over 20 Indian players with many signing long-term contracts and being assigned to the reserve team. Only a few players were retained from the previous season. Of them, Prakash Sarkar and Boithang Haokip were not registered in the ISL squad. East Bengal and Quess Corp's joint venture was terminated, and the club inked a partnership with Shree Cement as their principal investor in September. Robbie Fowler was appointed as the team's head coach. Forward Bright Enobakhare was signed in the winter transfer window as the seventh foreigner. Another foreign player, Callum Woods, was also signed as a reserve defender.

Due to investor issues and COVID-19, East Bengal could not start its league preparation until October. The club began their campaign with a loss in the Kolkata Derby. East Bengal got their first point against Jamshedpur, after three consecutive defeats. They were undefeated for the next seven matches. They ended their campaign by losing against  Odisha FC in an eleven-goal thriller, which was also the league's all-time highest scoring match. East Bengal's top goal scorer was Matti Steinmann with four goals in 17 matches. The club had six ISL Fans' Goal of the Week award from five players with four consecutive wins on week nine, 10, 11 and 12.

Background 
East Bengal officially announced that Balwant Singh had signed a two-year contract with the team on 12 April 2020. The next day the club signed former fullback Lalramchullova back from arch-rivals Mohun Bagan for the season as well as the services of Hyderabad defender Gurtej Singh.

On 18 April, the club announced a triple signing for the season: goalkeeper Rafique Ali Sardar from Jamshedpur, and Wahengbam Angousana and Loken Meitei from TRAU. The club announced the signing of three more Indian recruits: winger Bikash Jairu from Jamshedpur and midfielders Cavin Lobo and Sehnaj Singh from Punjab and ATK respectively, each on a two-year contract, on 28 April. After being stranded for more than a months due to lockdown all over India, the foreign contingent of the previous season squad started leaving for their home in the first week of May. The club announced four more signings: goalkeeper Sankar Roy from Mohun Bagan, defenders Mohammed Irshad from Gokulam Kerala, Keegan Pereira from Jamshedpur and Girik Khosla from Punjab on 5 May. The club announced three more signings on 15 May: midfielders Eugeneson Lyngdoh from Bengaluru, Mohammed Rafique from Mumbai City and Milan Singh from NorthEast United for the season. On 18 May, the club announced five more signings for the season: forward C. K. Vineeth from Jamshedpur, right-back Rino Anto from Bengaluru, left-back Pritam Kumar Singh from Kerala Blasters, defenders Anil Chawan from ATK and Vikas Saini from Mohammedan Sporting. Francisco Bruto Da Costa joined East Bengal as the interim assistant manager on 30 July 2020. The COVID-19 pandemic and lockdown led to the postponement of India's football season. It was announced that the season would start on 1 August 2020 and would continue until 31 May 2021.

Indian Super League entry 
The club's previous club investor, Quess Corp, announced in Autumn 2019 that they would leave the joint venture at the end of the season. In January 2020, arch-rivals, Mohun Bagan entered the Indian Super League (ISL), the de facto top tier of Indian Football, by merging with the defending ISL champions ATK, adding pressure on the club on top of its financial woes. The club began searching for potential investors. Back in 2018, it chose Quess to participate in the ISL, but that did not materialise. There were rumours the club would merge with the Bhubaneshwar-based ISL franchise, Odisha FC, but the club owner denied them. In March, during the ongoing 2019-20 I-League, the COVID-19 pandemic and lockdown began halting everything. Quess unilaterally activated the force majeure clause and terminated all players' and staff' contracts a month before the official exit on 1 May 2020. This was the first time the clause was activated in Indian football. It was rumoured that American consumer goods company Procter & Gamble would be the principal sponsor of the club and with them, EB would play in the ISL.

After the football season was declared complete, the club signed around 20 players to precontracts for the following season, but all of them were considered void, as the club did not have the sporting rights to compete in any league. In June, AIFF asked about the club's ownership status post-Quess separation for club licensing criteria, or East Bengal might not be able to play in any recognised tournament. The final termination, No Objection Certificate and sporting right transfer was delayed, but on 17 July, the joint venture with Quess East Bengal Pvt. Ltd was officially terminated, and the club got back the sporting rights from the firm . In the meantime, the former owner of Punjab FC, Ranjit Bajaj, expressed interest in buying the 70% outstanding shares. That month, a Singapore-based company, USEL also showed an interest in the club but later backed off because of uncertainty of playing in the ISL. By the end of July, Football Sports Development Limited (FSDL), unofficially stated there would be no expansion in the seventh season during a meeting with the ten ISL clubs. Club officials asked FSDL to consider the club's participation in this season and allow more time for the team to finalise its investors. The players of East Bengal's ASEAN Club Championship-winning team wrote to the club saying its priority should be to support COVID-19-affected people and not playing in the ISL. This led to a controversy in the club. After the club's foundation day, AIFF secretary, Kushal Das aroused speculation over EB joining the ISL saying, "I want to say nothing is impossible. What steps East Bengal should take – I think it is very important that you have to change with time, you have to get professional people. You have to have different departments. You need to have a sponsor servicing department. The fact that Quess and East Bengal had to part ways was not a good thing." On the 1 August, the club's assistant general secretary said on a chat show, "Whenever it is possible, we will play in the ISL. But we cannot say when we can join ISL. It is a legacy club and it has its heritage. But we have to change ourselves a bit and we are trying to reach that point and when that happens we will join ISL. But we cannot say when it will happen.” On 12 August, the expansion of the I-League was announced and AIFF vice-president mentioned 12 teams in the league which included East Bengal. This increased speculation further.

On 2 September 2020, the club and Chief Minister Mamata Banerjee announced at the state secretariat Nabanna that Kolkata-based firm Shree Cement was the club's new investor. The next day, FSDL invited bids for interested clubs from Delhi, Ludhiana, Ahmedabad, Kolkata, Siliguri and Bhopal. On 15 September, the club officially confirmed that they had submitted their bid papers for entry to the 2020–21 Indian Super League. The participation of East Bengal in the ISL was also unofficially confirmed. The club was rebranded as Sporting Club East Bengal. On 27 September, FSDL chairman, Nita Ambani announced East Bengal's move from the I-League to the Indian Super League for the 2020–21 season.

After entering the Indian Super League 
The club announced former India captain Renedy Singh would be the team's new assistant coach and Liverpool legend Robbie Fowler was signed as the team's new head coach on 9 October. He would be assisted by Anthony Grant, who was alongside him at Brisbane Roar last season. The backroom staff would include former Tottenham Hotspurs' goalkeeper Bobby Mimms as the goalkeeper coach, and former Blackpool manager Terry McPhillips as the set-piece coach. Robbie Fowler would be assisted by Michael Harding, the former physio of Newcastle United. Jack Inman, Former sports scientist from Bury, and Joseph Walmsley, an analyst from Preston North End joined management. The team became the first club in India to appoint a set-piece coach.

East Bengal announced the signing of Australian defender Scott Neville on loan from Brisbane Roar for the season as their first official signing. He was also to be registered as the Asian foreigner for the Indian Super League campaign. SC East Bengal announced the signing of four more foreigners: Aaron Amadi-Holloway from Brisbane Roar, Anthony Pilkington and Danny Fox from Wigan Athletic and Matti Steinmann from Wellington Phoenix. The club announced the signing of the India national football team forward Jeje Lalpekhlua for the season. On 19 October, East Bengal announced the signing of their sixth foreigner, Congolese winger Jacques Maghoma, who had played for EFL Championship side Birmingham City in the previous season. The club announced the signing of former left-back Narayan Das from Odisha.

During an online interaction on the club's social media, coach Robbie Fowler said: "We will look to develop a competitive team and try and develop Indian talent as well. We all hope the league can get better, the ISL and as management, we think we can better." Later, the team management hired sports psychologist Nicola McCalliog to assist the team for the season. McCalliog had previously worked with several English Premier League sides and was also the Head of Player Welfare and Psychology at the Robbie Fowler Academy.

Transfers

Incoming

Outgoing

Loan in

Loan out

Team

First-team squad

East Bengal announced their first-team squad on 20 October which included 22 domestic players. They had also signed six foreign players who were registered for the 2020–21 Indian Super League season. The following list consists of the registered players for the Indian Super League season. Danny Fox was announced as the captain of the side while Anthony Pilkington was announced as his deputy.

{|class="wikitable" style="text-align:center; font-size:90%; width:80%;"
|-
! style="background:#d71a23; color:#ffcd31; text-align:center;"|No.
! style="background:#d71a23; color:#ffcd31; text-align:center;"|Name
! style="background:#d71a23; color:#ffcd31; text-align:center;"|
! style="background:#d71a23; color:#ffcd31; text-align:center;"|Position(s)
! style="background:#d71a23; color:#ffcd31; text-align:center;"|Date of Birth (Age)
|-
! colspan="5" style="background:#ffcd31; color:#d71a23; text-align:center;"|Goalkeepers
|-
|24
|Debjit Majumder
|
|GK
|
|-
|32
|Mirshad Michu
|
|GK
|
|-
|40
|Suvam Sen
|
|GK
|
|-
|91
|Subrata Paul
|
|GK
|
|-
! colspan="5" style="background:#d71a23; color:#ffcd31; text-align:center;"|Defenders
|-
|2
|Scott Neville
|
|CB/RB
|
|-  
|4
|Danny Fox (captain)
|
|CB
|
|-
|16
|Rana Gharami
|
|CB
|
|- 
|21
|Narayan Das 
|
|LB
|
|- 
|27
|Lalramchullova
|
|LB/RB
|
|-
|31
|Rohen Singh
|
|CB
|
|- 
|47
|Raju Gaikwad
|
|CB/RB
|
|-
|55
|Ankit Mukherjee
|
|RB
|
|-
|70
|Sarthak Golui
|
|CB
|
|-
! colspan="5" style="background:#ffcd31; color:#d71a23; text-align:center;"|Midfielders
|- 
|6
|Matti Steinmann
|
|CDM
|
|-
|8
|Mohammed Rafique
|
|CM
|
|-
|14
|Wahengbam Angousana
|
|CM
|
|-
|17
|Yumnam Singh
|
|LW
|
|- 
|18
|Eugeneson Lyngdoh
|
|CM
|
|- 
|19
|Jacques Maghoma
|
|LW/AM
|
|-
|20
|Aaron Amadi-Holloway
|
|MF
|
|-
|22
|Anthony Pilkington (vice-captain)
|
|LW/RW/AM
|
|- 
|23
|Bikash Jairu
|
|LW
|
|-
|26
|Sehnaj Singh
|
|CDM
|
|-
|29
|Surchandra Singh
|
|RW
|
|- 
|33
|Loken Meitei
|
|LW
|
|-
|35
|Milan Singh
|
|CDM
|
|-
|44
|Haobam Tomba Singh
|
|CM
|
|-
|56
|Ajay Chhetri
|
|CDM
|
|-
|88
|Sourav Das
|
|CM
|
|-
! colspan="5" style="background:#d71a23; color:#ffcd31; text-align:center;"|Forwards
|- 
|10
|Bright Enobakhare
|
|FW
|
|-
|12
|Jeje Lalpekhlua
|
|FW
|
|-
|15
|Balwant Singh
|
|FW
|
|-
|28
|Girik Khosla
|
|FW
|
|-
|30 
|C. K. Vineeth
|
|FW
|
|-
|34
|Harmanpreet Singh
|
|FW
|
|-

Other players under contract
Some newly contracted players, and players with existing contracts, were not registered in the first team squad. They are:

Coaching staff

Kit
East Bengal signed Indian apparel brand TYKA Sports as the new kit sponsors for the 2020–21 season. On 2 November, the club launched all three sets of kits for the 2020–21 season, each one depicting a symbol for the club and Bengal. The home colours are the iconic red and gold and the kit depicts the flames of the Torch or "Mashal", the club's emblem. The away colours are blue and white, depicting the scales of Hilsa or "Ilish", the fish which is associated with the Bangal family. It also shows the rivers and waters that flow between and connect the Eastern and Western parts of Bengal, providing life to the people. The third kit is black with golden stripes, symbolising the Sunderbans and its famous inhabitant, the Royal Bengal Tiger.

Pre-season 

East Bengal and coach Robbie Fowler along with his coaching staff arrived at Goa on 16 October for pre-season preparation. Due to the COVID-19 pandemic in India, the team spent 14 days in quarantine in the team's hotel before beginning pre-season training. The first practice session under Fowler began on 30 October 2020, with just four weeks to prepare before the season opener against ATK Mohun Bagan. East Bengal management acquired the Sesa Football Academy ground for the season as their home base for training.

On 10 November, East Bengal faced the Kerala Blasters in their first pre-season practice game and won 3–1 courtesy of a brace from Anthony Pilkington in the first half, which put the Red and Gold brigade 2–0 ahead at half time. In the second half, Gary Hooper pulled one back for the Blasters, but Yumnam Singh scored the third for East Bengal, who won 3–1.

Pre-season friendlies

Competitions

Overall

Overview

Indian Super League

Summary 

East Bengal officially joined the Indian Super League as the 11th team after the FSDL accepted their bid documents. This is the first time the team has played in the ISL. Due to the COVID-19 pandemic, the 2020–21 Indian Super League season was held entirely at Goa under a secured bio-bubble. The club was allotted the Tilak Maidan Stadium as their home ground for the season.

November 
East Bengal made their debut in the Indian Super League on 27 November against their arch-rivals ATK Mohun Bagan at the Tilak Maidan Stadium in Goa. However, the Red and Gold brigade suffered a 0–2 defeat in their opening game courtesy of strikes from Roy Krishna and Manvir Singh for ATK Mohun Bagan.

December 
East Bengal faced Mumbai City in their second game campaign at the GMC Athletic Stadium, Bambolim, on 1 December and were defeated 3–0, with Adam Le Fondre scoring two goals and Hernan Santana scoring the third for the Islanders. East Bengal captain Danny Fox sustained a groin injury in the second minute of the game and had to leave the field. Le Fondre scored the first from a counter-attack in the 20th minute as Hugo Boumous set him up in front of an open net. The second goal came just after the restart from a penalty as Debjit Majumder took down Le Fondre inside the box. The third goal came in the 58th minute from a set-piece movement as Hernan Santana scored unmarked from inside the penalty area.

In the third match, the club faced NorthEast United on 5 December at the Tilak Maidan Stadium and suffered a hat-trick of losses as they went down 2–0. Controversially, the red and gold brigade were denied a penalty early in the first half when Ashutosh Mehta tripped Jacques Maghoma inside the box, with Ashutosh already on a yellow, but referee Santosh Kumar ignored the calls. The opening goal came in the 33rd minute when a cross from the right flank struck Surchandra Singh and went into his net for an own goal. The second goal came in the dying minutes of the game against the run of play from a counter-attack as Rochharzela tapped in from close range to make it 2–0 for the Highlanders—a third consecutive defeat for the East Bengal team, who had yet to score a goal in the campaign.

On 10 December, East Bengal next faced Jamshedpur in their fourth match of the campaign at the Tilak Maidan Stadium. Their first match in the Indian Super League was a hard-fought goalless draw, having played more than 70 minutes with only 10 men. Eugeneson Lyngdoh, who got his first start for East Bengal, was sent off with double bookings in the 25th minute of the game. The 10-man East Bengal team kept a clean sheet at the back, with Mohammed Irshad being awarded Hero of the Match for his excellent defensive display.

East Bengal played Hyderabad FC on 15 December in their fifth game at the Tilak Maidan Stadium and suffered yet another defeat as they went down 3–2. It was Jacques Maghoma who scored the first-ever goal for East Bengal in the Indian Super League in the 26th minute to put them ahead. Hyderabad had a chance to equalise in the dying minutes of the first half as they were awarded a penalty kick, but Debjit Majumder saved Aridane Santana's spot-kick to keep the lead at halftime. Hyderabad rallied back in the second half, however, as Aridane Santana scored two goals within 54 seconds to take the lead in the 56th minute. In the 69th minute, Halicharan Narzary tapped in the third for Hyderabad after Liston Colaco dribbled past the East Bengal defence to square it to him for the finish and take a two-goal lead. Jacques Maghoma did score another with a glancing header off Anthony Pilkington's set-piece in the 81st minute, but it was not enough as East Bengal suffered their fourth loss in five matches.

East Bengal announced their eighth foreign signing for the season. English defender Calum Woods joined the side in Goa. However, he was not registered into the ISL squad immediately but kept as a backup option. The club faced Kerala Blasters next on 20 December at the GMC Stadium, Bambolim, and shared points after Kerala Blasters scored in the dying minutes to make it 1–1. East Bengal took the lead in the 13th minute after Mohammed Rafique's low grounder went inside the net, having been deflected off Kerala Blasters' defender Bakary Kone as an own goal. East Bengal had a few more chances to bury the game but failed to utilise them. Kerala Blasters equalised in the 95th minute of the game, with Jeakson Singh scoring a header from inside the box. The red and gold brigade moved up a place to 10th after earning a single point from the game.

On 26 December, East Bengal faced Chennaiyin at the Tilak Maidan Stadium and came from behind twice to draw 2–2 courtesy of a brace from German midfielder Matti Steinmann. Chennaiyin FC took the lead early in the 13th minute after Lallianzuala Chhangte scored from a fast counter-movement. East Bengal equalised in the second half in the 59th minute as Matti headed in from a corner-kick by Bikash Jairu. Chennaiyin FC once again took the lead just five minutes later in the 64th minute, with Rahim Ali finishing from close range to make it 2–1. However, once again, Matti Steinmann tapped home a rebound from Danny Fox's header from another corner by Bikash Jairu in the 68th minute. East Bengal remained win-less after seven matches in the Indian Super League with just three points.

January 
On 1 January, East Bengal announced the signing of 22-year-old Nigerian U-23 forward Bright Enobakhare, who last played for the Greek side AEK Athens. On 2 January, the team announced the double signing of Indian defenders Ankit Mukherjee from ATK Mohun Bagan and Raju Gaikwad, who played for Kerala Blasters last season. Jaime Santos, the only foreigner   from the previous season with long term contract was released and he joined Palmaflor in January. Lalrindika Ralte was not registered for the ISL squad and in joined I-League side, Real Kashmir after being released from the club.

The first game of 2021 was against Odisha, on 3 January at the Tilak Maidan Stadium and grabbed their first win of the campaign with a score of 3–1. Anthony Pilkington opened the scoring for East Bengal in the 12th minute as he headed in from a long throw-in by Raju Gaikwad. Jacques Maghoma doubled the lead in the 39th minute with a left-footed finish as he scored his third goal of the season. In the second half, debutant Bright Enobakhare scored the third in the 88th minute to seal the victory for the red and gold brigade. An own goal by Danny Fox was a consolation for Odisha in the 92nd minute and East Bengal got all three points for the first time in the season.

The team faced Goa at the Fatorda Stadium on 6 January and shared points with a 1–1 draw, even after playing with 10 men for more than 40 minutes in the second half. East Bengal had the better chances in the game, but Danny Fox and Matti Steinmann failed to convert the opportunities. Fox was given a straight red card in the 56th minute for dangerous play, but again it was the red and gold brigade who created more chances. In the 79th minute, Nigerian forward Bright Enobakhare, who had his first start for the team, scored a goal after dribbling past five Goa players to finish the ball and put East Bengal ahead. However, Goa equalised the score a minute later with a Devendra Murgaonkar header. Bright Enobakhare put the ball inside the net once more, but it was ruled off for a foul. East Bengal managed to hold the Goans for the final minutes and shared points. They remain unbeaten in their last four matches with seven points on the table from nine games.

East Bengal played Bengaluru on 9 January at the Fatorda Stadium in their last game of the first leg of the 2020–21 ISL and secured their second win of the campaign by a 1–0 margin. East Bengal had the red card decision on Danny Fox overturned by the disciplinary committee and EB captain started the game. The solitary strike came in the 20th minute as Matti Steinmann flicked in Narayan Das's low cross from close range. East Bengal remained unbeaten in five matches with this win and reached 10 points from as many games played.

On 11 January, East Bengal signed United's goalkeeper Suvam Sen as a replacement for Rafique Ali Sardar, who went on loan to Mohammedan Sporting. The team also announced the signing of the defensive midfielder Ajay Chhetri from Bengaluru on loan for the rest of the season.

The team played Kerala Blasters in the return fixture at the Tilak Maidan Stadium on 15 January and scored a last-minute equaliser to earn a 1–1 draw. Raju Gaikwad was injured during the warm-up and had to be replaced by Rana Gharami. The first half remained goalless, but it was Kerala Blasters who took the lead in the 56th minute as Jordan Murray scored past Debjit following a long ball from goalkeeper Albino Gomes. East Bengal found the equaliser in the dying moments at the 94th minute when Scott Neville headed into the net from Bright Enobakhare's corner kick. East Bengal managed to keep their undefeated run alive and grab a point from the game.

The club played Chennaiyin on 18 January at the GMC Stadium and managed to keep their unbeaten run ongoing with a 0–0 draw even after going down to 10 men in the 30th minute. Ajay Chhetri, who got his first start for the team, was given red card right after the half-hour mark after a double booking. East Bengal still managed to hold on with Hero of the Match Debjit Majumder making some vital saves late in the second half as East Bengal grabbed a point and remained undefeated in seven matches in a row.

Two players from the previous season, Samad Ali Mallick and Abhishek Ambekar and new recruit Mohammed Irshad were de-registered and parted ways from the club. Samad Ali Mallick and Mohammed Irshad joined Punjab; Abhishek Ambekar joined the new I-League entrants, Sudeva Delhi. Brandon Vanlalremdika was loaned out to another I-League club, Aizawl.

The team played table-toppers Mumbai City on 22 January next at the Tilak Maidan Stadium and in a tightly contested game, succumbed to a 0–1 defeat courtesy of a solitary goal from Mumbai defender Mourtada Fall in the 27th minute. The red and gold brigade went all out in the second half as Danny Fox came close to equalising the score but failed. East Bengal's seven-match undefeated streak came to an end with this defeat.

On 26 January, East Bengal announced the signing of veteran goalkeeper Subrata Paul on loan from Hyderabad. The deal was a swap loan deal with Sankar Roy joining Hyderabad until the end of the season on loan.

East Bengal played FC Goa on 29 January at the Fatorda Stadium and managed to secure another 1–1 draw after trailing in the first half. Igor Angulo put Goa ahead in the 39th minute after Anthony Pilkington squandered a spot-kick early in the second minute of the game. Skipper Danny Fox equalised for East Bengal in the 65th minute from a set-piece movement. Goa was down to 10-men in the 66th minute after Edu Bedia was showrn red card for double booking, but East Bengal failed to capitalise on the opportunity and shared the points with yet another draw.

February 

On 1 February, transfer deadline day, East Bengal announced the double signing of defender Sarthak Golui and midfielder Sourav Das from Mumbai City. Next day, East Bengal played Bengaluru at the Tilak Maidan Stadium and suffered a 0–2 defeat. Brazilian forward Cleiton Silva put Bengaluru ahead in the 12th minute with a left-footed finish. The blues doubled their lead in the 45th minute when Parag Shrivas hit the ball onto the sidebar, only to rebound and struck Debjit Majumder's legs to go in for an own goal. Bengaluru could have increased their lead in the second half as Sunil Chhetri hit the crossbar. This was the sixth defeat of the season for East Bengal, as they remained on 13 points from 15 matches.

Coach Robbie Fowler was handed a four-match ban and a fine by the tournament committee for making alleged "insulting remarks" about match officials of the Goa game in a post-match interview.

East Bengal faced Jamshedpur on 7 February at the Fatorda Stadium and won 2–1. Matti Steinmann put East Bengal ahead in the 65th minute with a header off a Narayan Das's corner. Anthony Pilkington doubled the lead in the 68th minute with a shot after Steinmann played him inside the box. Peter Hartley pulled one back for Jamshedpur in the 83rd minute, but the Red and Gold brigade managed to hold on to the lead and grab their third win of the campaign and move to ninth place.

On 12 February, EB faced Hyderabad at the Tilak Maidan Stadium and drew 1–1 to share points. Bright Enobakhare put East Bengal ahead in the 59th minute after being played through by Anthony Pilkington with a headed flick. Aridane Santana equalised for Hyderabad in injury time to deny East Bengal all three points. Bright Enobakhare had a genuine spor-kick turned down after being taken down by Laxmikant Kattimani inside the box. With eight draws and three wins, The team remained in ninth place with 17 points.

On 19 February, in the return leg of the Kolkata Derby and the team suffered another defeat as the game ended 3–1. Roy Krishna put ATK Mohun Bagan ahead in the 15th minute with a solo finish grabbing onto a long ball from Tiri. East Bengal equalised in the 41st minute as Tiri headed inside his net for an own goal from a Raju Gaikwad's long throw. In the second half, David Williams put ATK Mohun Bagan ahead again following an error by East Bengal skipper Danny Fox in the 72nd minute. Substitute Javi Hernandez doubled their lead in the 89th minute with a header as they secured a victory.

The club faced NorthEast United next on 23 February in their penultimate game of the season and suffered another defeat as the game ended 2–1 in favour of the Highlander brigade. V.P. Suhair scored the opening goal for NorthEast United in the 48th minute before Sarthak Golui put the ball inside his net for an own goal in the 55th minute and NorthEast United doubled their lead. Sarthak Golui scored the consolation for the Red and Gold brigade in the 87th minute from a header of a dead-ball situation, however, it was not enough to save a defeat.

In the last game of the season, East Bengal played Odisha and suffered their ninth defeat of the season in a high-scoring encounter which ended 6–5 for Odisha. Paul Ramfangzauva and Jerry Mawihmingthanga scored a brace while Lalhrezuala Sailung and Diego Maurício scored one each of Odisha's six goals while Aaron Amadi-Holloway netted twice with Anthony Pilkington and Jeje Lalpekhlua finding the back of the net along with an own goal from Ravi Kumar as EB ended their season with an all-time low, letting in six goals for the second time in domestic competition since independence. The match became the highest scoring match in league history. East Bengal ended their ISL inaugural campaign with 17 points finishing in ninth place. 

After the last match of the season, Fowler stated, "The planning has already started. As soon as the season ends, we automatically start planning for the next season. We just did not have enough time this year in terms of preparation. With the right recruitment and the right time frame on the training pitches, and with my ideas and methods of the way we want to play, we can do better."

League table

Result summary

Results by round

Matches 
The season fixtures for the first 10 matches were released on 30 October. East Bengal began their campaign against rivals ATK Mohun Bagan on 27 November 2020. The rest of the fixtures were announced on 2 January 2021.

Statistics

Appearances
Players with no appearances not included in the list.

Goal scorers

Assists

Clean sheets

Disciplinary record

Club awards

ISL Fans' Goal of the Week award 

This is awarded weekly to the player chosen by fans voting at the Indian Super League website.

See also 
 2020–21 in Indian football

Notes

References

External links 

 Official website

East Bengal Club seasons
East Bengal